Darren Cahill and Sandon Stolle were the defending champions, but Cahill did not compete this year. Stolle teamed up with John Fitzgerald and lost in the first round to Jared Palmer and Richey Reneberg.

Todd Woodbridge and Mark Woodforde won the title by defeating Trevor Kronemann and David Macpherson 7–6, 6–4 in the final.

Seeds

Draw

Draw

References

External links
 Official results archive (ATP)
 Official results archive (ITF)

Men's Doubles
Doubles